The Freelance League is a name for a loosely defined high school athletic league that is part of the CIF Southern Section. Member schools are small schools. The word "Freelance" describes that they find competitive situations where available without a formal league structure.  Schools are spread across the entire section from San Luis Obispo County to San Bernardino County and Riverside County. In certain sports some of these teams are part of other leagues.

The 1993 film Gridiron Gang was inspired by the Kilpatrick Mustangs. Jordan Hasay was a hero at the 2008 Olympic Trials while still a junior at Mission Prep. Verbum Dei has a lengthy championship history. Bellarmine-Jefferson High School has hosted the Bell-Jeff Invitational, a large cross country meet, since 1974 that has become a Southern California institution.

Members
 Vernon Kilpatrick Camp School (Kilpatrick High School)
 LaVerne Lutheran	
 Santa Rosa Academy, Menifee
 Valley Torah High School	
 Edgewood High School	
 Rancho Christian School	
 Indian Springs High School	
 Rancho Christian School
 Crossroads Christian School
 Hope Centre Academy
 Antelope Valley Christian School	
 Eastside Christian School
 Lake Arrowhead Christian School
 Bellarmine-Jefferson High School
Lakeview leadership academy

References

CIF Southern Section leagues